The Haseltine Building is a historic property in Portland, Oregon near the Willamette River and on the edge of the city's Central Business district. Located at the intersection of Southwest 2nd Avenue and Ash Street, the building was designed by architects McGraw & Martin, and built in 1893.  It was originally used by J.E. Haseltine & Co., a family owned and operated company that sold hardware, supplies and equipment from 1883- 1961. The building underwent a significant renovation in 2020. Today, it is primarily an office building home to a variety of tenants who appreciate its rich history and irreplaceable visual elements, such as the red brick, and giant old-growth timber beams and columns. 

As of December 2021, the building had four suites totaling 6,173 square feet available for lease. Marketing materials for the property highlight a number of tenant amenities, including a bike room and shower facilities, new common area finishes, operable windows and easy access to parking and public transportation.

References

External links

 Haseltine Building at Emporis
Haseltine Building at Colliers

Buildings and structures in Portland, Oregon
Old Town Chinatown
Southwest Portland, Oregon